Teratomyces is a genus of fungi in the family Laboulbeniaceae. The genus contain 9 species.

References

External links
Teratomyces at Index Fungorum

Laboulbeniomycetes